World Class Fussball/Soccer is a football game for the Atari Lynx.

Gameplay 

In World Class Fussball/Soccer you can choose from over 100 different countries to play with. The premise of the game is you have made it to the "World Class Finals" and are facing against the defending World Champions.

Development and release

Reception 

Robert A Jung reviewed the game which was published to IGN, in his final verdict he wrote "This game has the ingredients for a quality soccer game, but assembles them into a disappointing ensemble that could have been better." Giving a score of 5 out of 10.

Notes

References

External links 
 World Class Fussball/Soccer at AtariAge
 World Class Fussball/Soccer at GameFAQs
 World Class Fussball/Soccer at MobyGames

1992 video games
Association football video games
Atari games
Atari Lynx games
Atari Lynx-only games
Multiplayer and single-player video games
Video games developed in the United States